KDLP may refer to:

 Democratic Labor Party (South Korea)
 KDLP-LP, a low-power radio station (104.7 FM) licensed to Ace, Texas, United States